Atherton Darling Converse (January 7, 1877 – July 6, 1956) was an American was a Harvard educated businessman, a toy manufacturer and politician from Winchendon, Massachusetts, who served in the Massachusetts House of Representatives after being elected to the 128th Massachusetts General Court in 1906. He represented the second district of Worcester County, Massachusetts.

Biography
Converse was born in Rindge, New Hampshire. He was the son of Morton E. Converse (1837–1917) and Harriet Maria Atherton (1841–1886).

His father came to Winchendon, Massachusetts in 1878 and established a toy and woodenware business. Converse eventually took over the family business, and as a toy manufacturer, at its peak, he employed over 1000 people at Morton E. Converse & Son Co. He patented many toys, from spinning tops to toy planes.
By the time he branched into doll house furniture and accessories, it was one of the largest manufacturers of its kind by volume until the 1930s. He was a director of the Safety Fund Bank of Fitchburg, Massachusetts. During the 1930s he was president of Toy Town Tavern Inc. and Treasurer to the New England Hotel Association.

Converse entered politics at a state level, serving only one term.

In 1909 he accompanied Charles Jasper Glidden in a hot air balloon flight to demonstrate the practicability and accuracy of dropping explosives from the height of one mile, using eggs.

He married Delia Minton on March 30, 1910. He married his second wife, Harriet Dorothy Taylor in 1932.

External links

Ancestry
His maternal grandfather was Thomas Atherton (1799-1869), a manufacturer of machinery who migrated to Lowell, Massachusetts in 1827 from Preston, England. His uncle Dr Abel T. Atherton was co-proprietor of the Lowell-based, Whitehead & Atherton Machine Company, as well as the Potter & Atherton Machine Company of Pawtucket, Rhode Island.

See also
1907 Massachusetts legislature

References

1877 births
1956 deaths
People from Rindge, New Hampshire
People from Winchendon, Massachusetts
Members of the Massachusetts House of Representatives
American inventors
American toy industry businesspeople
Toy inventors
Harvard College alumni